Albert Vincent Casey (February 28, 1920 – July 10, 2004) was a United States Postmaster General, publisher of Los Angeles Times, and an attendee of the Bohemian Grove. He received two degrees from Harvard University in 1948.

Casey was born in Arlington, Massachusetts. He served in the United States Army for four years during World War II. He served on the New York State Financial Control Board when it was first formed in 1975.  He spent eight years as President of Times Mirror Company and was CEO of American Airlines from 1974 to 1985. He was a Distinguished Executive at the Woodrow Wilson International Center for Scholars. He died at his home in Dallas, Texas.

References

Further reading

"Business Notes BANKING" Time.com April 25, 1988 
"Albert V. Casey, 84, American Air Chief, Dies" NY Times, July 14, 2004, 
" R.T.C.'s Chief Stepping Down" NY Times, February 18, 1993, 

|-

1920 births
2004 deaths
20th-century American businesspeople
American airline chief executives
American Airlines people
United States Army personnel of World War II
American publishers (people)
Harvard Business School alumni
Military personnel from Massachusetts
People from Arlington, Massachusetts
United States Army soldiers
United States Postmasters General
Whitewater controversy
Reagan administration personnel